Brian K. Borgen is a major general in the United States Air Force who serves as the mobilization assistant to the Deputy Chief of Staff for Operations of the United States Air Force since June 2021. He most recently served as commander of the Tenth Air Force from May 2019 to June 2021.

Air Force career
Brian K. Borgen graduated from Kansas State University in 1988. He joined the United States Air Force in March 1990, and attended Undergraduate Pilot Training at Williams Air Force Base. In 1995, he began flying the A-10 Thunderbolt. In May 2019, he assumed command of the Tenth Air Force.

Dates of rank

References

Kansas State University alumni
Living people
Recipients of the Legion of Merit
United States Air Force generals
United States Air Force personnel of the Iraq War
United States Air Force personnel of the War in Afghanistan (2001–2021)
Year of birth missing (living people)